The 1991 Liquid Tide Trans-Am Tour was the 26th season of the Sports Car Club of America's Trans-Am Series. It was the first season with competition from the sister SCCA Pro Racing World Challenge. 1991 was also the first season since 1979 to have a round outside of the United States and Canada, with a race in Mexico on the schedule that year. Oldsmobile, although very successful in 1991, would never again see success in Trans Am.

Results

Final points standings

References

Trans-Am Series
1991 in American motorsport